Gongchen may refer to:

 Gongchen tank
 Gongchen Tower
 Khorgas

See also
 Gongcheng Yao Autonomous County
 Gonchen Monastery